MLB 15: The Show is a Major League Baseball video game developed by San Diego Studio and published by Sony Computer Entertainment. It is the tenth entry of the MLB: The Show franchise, and was released on March 31, 2015, for PlayStation 3, PlayStation 4 and PlayStation Vita.

Matt Vasgersian, Eric Karros, and Steve Lyons return as commentators. Mike Carlucci returns as public address announcer. Legends can be used as free agents in the Franchise and Season modes in the game.

On October 31, 2017, Sony decommissioned the game's online servers.

New features 
The game adds licensed equipment, including fielding gloves, batting gloves, cleats and bats.

Year to Year Saves 
Players who purchased MLB 14: The Show will be able to transfer their Franchise, Road to the Show and Postseason Mode progress into MLB 15: The Show, and continue where they previously left off. Players who have save data from the PS3 version of MLB 14: The Show will also be able to carry the data over to the PS4 version of MLB 15: The Show, and vice versa.

Universal Rewards 
The game also features a brand new universal rewards system, which allows players to earn cards and stubs by playing any game mode. Rewards include player cards for use in the game's fantasy baseball mode, "Diamond Dynasty", as well as equipment, sponsorships or stadiums. Other features include a new "Community Market" where players can buy and sell cards using Stubs.

Cover athletes
On December 6, 2014, it was announced that Los Angeles Dodgers outfielder Yasiel Puig will be on the game's American cover. On February 5, 2015, it was announced that Toronto Blue Jays catcher Russell Martin will feature on the Canadian retail release of the game's cover.

Reception 

MLB 15: The Show received "generally favorable" reviews upon release. The PlayStation 4 version of the game received an aggregated score of 81% on GameRankings based on 29 reviews and 80/100 on Metacritic based on 37 reviews. The PlayStation Vita version holds a 71% score on GameRankings.

Before the game's initial release, Sony did not provide review copies of the game for critical reviews. According to a Sony representative, the reason for the delay was "due to this year's flagship Universal Rewards feature, which will require active servers to function." Review copies were distributed on the public release date, March 31.

Soundtrack

References

2015 video games
Major League Baseball video games
 15
Multiplayer and single-player video games
PlayStation 3 games
PlayStation 4 games
PlayStation Vita games
Sony Interactive Entertainment games
Sports video games with career mode
Video games developed in the United States
Video games set in Canada
Video games set in the United States
Video games set in Maryland
San Diego Studio games